Saheb Ekhtiarieh castle is a historical castle located in Asadabad County in Hamadan Province, The longevity of this fortress dates back to the Qajar dynasty.

References 

Castles in Iran
Qajar castles